Malmö Fotbollförening, also known simply as Malmö FF, is a Swedish professional association football club based in Malmö. The club is affiliated with Skånes Fotbollförbund (the Scanian Football Association), and plays its home games at Stadion. Formed on 24 February 1910, Malmö FF is the most successful club in Sweden in terms of trophies won. The club have won the most Swedish championship titles of any club with twenty, a record twenty-three league titles, and a record fourteen national cup titles. The team competes in Allsvenskan as of the 2018 season, the club's 18th consecutive season in the top flight, and their 83rd overall. The main rivals of the club are Helsingborgs IF, IFK Göteborg and, historically, IFK Malmö.

This list encompasses the major honours won by Malmö FF and records set by the club, their managers and their players. The player records section includes details of the club's leading goalscorers and those who have made most appearances in first-team competitions. It also records notable achievements by Malmö FF players on the international stage. The club's attendance records, at Stadion, their home since 2009, Malmö Stadion, their home between 1958 and 2008, and Malmö IP, their home between 1910 and 1958, are also included in the list.

The club currently holds the record for the most Swedish championships with 20, the most Allsvenskan titles with 23 and Svenska Cupen triumphs with 14. The club's record appearance maker is Krister Kristensson, who made 348 league appearances between 1963 and 1978, and the club's record goalscorer is Hans Håkansson, who scored 163 goals in 192 league games between 1927 and 1938.

All statistics accurate as of match played 6 November 2016.

Honors
Malmö FF's first trophy was the Division 2 Sydsvenska Serien, which they won in the 1920–21 season. Their first national senior honour came first in 1944, when they won the 1943–44 Allsvenskan title. The club also won Svenska Cupen for the first time the same year. In terms of the number of trophies won, the 1970s was Malmö FF's most successful decade, during which time they won five league titles and four cup titles.

The club currently holds the record for most Swedish championships with 22, most Allsvenskan titles with 25, most Svenska Cupen titles with 15, and the record for the most Svenska Cupen final appearances with eighteen. They also became the first and, as of 2017, the only Swedish club to reach the final of the European Cup (present day UEFA Champions League) in 1979. Malmö FF is also the only Nordic club to have been represented at the Intercontinental Cup (succeeded by FIFA Club World Cup) in which they competed for the 1979 title. Their most recent major trophy came in October 2016, when they won their most recent Allsvenskan title.

Domestic

 Swedish Champions
 Winners (22): 1943–44, 1948–49, 1949–50, 1950–51, 1952–53, 1965, 1967, 1970, 1971, 1974, 1975, 1977, 1986, 1988, 2004, 2010, 2013, 2014, 2016, 2017, 2020, 2021

League
 Allsvenskan (Tier 1)
 Winners (25): 1943–44, 1948–49, 1949–50, 1950–51, 1952–53, 1965, 1967, 1970, 1971, 1974, 1975, 1977, 1985, 1986, 1987,  1988, 1989, 2004, 2010, 2013, 2014, 2016, 2017, 2020, 2021
 Runners-up (14): 1945–46, 1947–48, 1951–52, 1955–56, 1956–57, 1964, 1968, 1969, 1976, 1978, 1980, 1983, 1996, 2002
 Division 2 Sydsvenska Serien (Tier 2)
 Winners (1): 1920–21
 Runners-up (1): 1923–24
 Division 2 Södra (Tier 2)
 Winners (3): 1930–31, 1934–35, 1935–36
 Runners-up (1): 1929–30
 Superettan (Tier 2)
 Runners-up (1): 2000

Cups
 Svenska Cupen
 Winners (15): 1944, 1946, 1947, 1951, 1953, 1967, 1972–73, 1973–74, 1974–75, 1977–78, 1979–80, 1983–84, 1985–86, 1988–89, 2021–22
 Runners-up (6): 1945, 1970–71, 1995–96, 2015–16, 2017–18, 2019–20
 Allsvenskan play-offs
 Winners (2): 1986, 1988
 Runners-up (2): 1987, 1989
 Svenska Supercupen Last season was in 2015
 Winners (2): 2013, 2014
 Runners-up (1): 2011
 Distriktsmästerskap: Skåne (Regional championship of Scania) Last season was in 1966
 Winners (22): 1927, 1938, 1939, 1942, 1943, 1944, 1945, 1946, 1947, 1948, 1951, 1953, 1954, 1955, 1956, 1958, 1959, 1960, 1963, 1964, 1965, 1966
 Runners up (4): 1916, 1922, 1937, 1952

Doubles
 Allsvenskan and Svenska Cupen
 Winners (8): 1943–44, 1950–51, 1952–53, 1967, 1974, 1975, 1986, 1989

European
 European Cup
 Runners-up (1): 1978–79

Worldwide
 Intercontinental Cup Last season was in 2004
 Runners-up (1): 1979

Awards
 Svenska Dagbladet Gold Medal
 Winners (1) 1979

Players

Appearances
 Youngest first-team player: Alexander Nilsson –  (against IF Elfsborg, Allsvenskan, 17 September 2008)
 Youngest goalscorer: Lars Granström –  (against Djurgårdens IF, Allsvenskan, 15 May 1960)

Most league appearances

The following is a list of the ten Malmö FF players with the most league appearances.

Goalscorers
 Most goals scored in a season, Lower league: 30 – Hans Håkansson, 1935–36
 Most goals scored in a season, Allsvenskan: 28 – Bo Larsson, 1965

Overall scorers

The following is a list of the ten Malmö FF players who have scored the most league goals.

Award winners

Guldbollen

The following is a list of the Malmö FF players who have won Guldbollen while at the club. The award is given by the Swedish newspaper Aftonbladet and the Swedish Football Association to the best male Swedish footballer each year.

Allsvenskan top scorer

The following is a list of the Malmö FF players who have become the Allsvenskan top scorer while at the club.

Allsvenskan records held by players of the club
As of the end of the 2017 season.

Managers

Longest serving manager: Bob Houghton (managed the club for 304 games over two spells; 226 games from 13 April 1974 to 25 June 1980 and 78 games from 8 April 1990 to 19 July 1992).
First foreign manager: Václav Simon (Czechoslovakian – managed the club for 22 games from 9 August 1936 to 13 June 1937).

Allsvenskan records held by managers of the club
As of the end of the 2017 season.

Club records

Matches
 First competitive match: Malmö FF 4–2 IFK Malmö, Distriktsmästerskap, Quarter-finals, 27 June 1911
 First league match: Malmö FF 3–0 IS Halmia, Division 2 Sydsvenska Serien, 2 May 1920
 First Allsvenskan match: Malmö FF 0–1 IFK Göteborg, 2 August 1931
 First Svenska Cupen match: Malmö FF 11–0 Vivstavarvs IK, Round 1, 13 July 1941
 First European match: Lokomotiv Sofia 8–3 Malmö FF, European Cup Preliminary Round, first leg, 10 September 1964
 First competitive match at Malmö IP: Malmö FF 4–2 IFK Malmö, Distriktsmästerskap, Quarter-finals, 27 June 1911
 First competitive match at Malmö Stadion: Malmö FF 4–4 IFK Malmö, Allsvenskan, 8 August 1958
 First competitive match at Stadion: Malmö FF 3–0 Örgryte IS, Allsvenskan, 13 April 2009

Record wins
Record overall win: 12–0
Malmö FF – Halmstad BK, Allsvenskan, 3 June 1943
Malmö FF – Jönköpings Södra IF, Allsvenskan, 26 May 1949
Record league win: 12–0
Malmö FF – Halmstad BK, Allsvenskan, 3 June 1943
Malmö FF – Jönköpings Södra IF, Allsvenskan, 26 May 1949
Record Svenska Cupen win: 11–0
Malmö FF – Vivstavarvs IK, Round 1, 13 July 1941
Stenungsunds IF – Malmö FF, Round 2, 1 May 2007
Record European win: Malmö FF 11–0 Pezoporikos Larnaca, European Cup Winners' Cup, First round, second leg, 22 September 1973
Record home win: 12–0
Malmö FF – Halmstad BK, Allsvenskan, 3 June 1943
Malmö FF – Jönköpings Södra IF, Allsvenskan, 26 May 1949
Record away win: Stenungsunds IF 0–11 Malmö FF, Svenska Cupen, Round 2, 1 May 2007

Record defeats
Record overall defeat: Kalmar FF 9–0 Malmö FF, Division 2, 19 August 1928
Record league defeat: Kalmar FF 9–0 Malmö FF, Division 2, 19 August 1928
Record Allsvenskan defeat: 1–7
IF Elfsborg – Malmö FF, Allsvenskan, 16 October 1932
AIK – Malmö FF, Allsvenskan, 31 August 1960
Record Svenska Cupen defeat: 0–4
IFK Norrköping – Malmö FF, Round 5, 17 August 1969
Mjällby AIF – Malmö FF, Round 2, 25 August 1999
Djurgårdens IF – Malmö FF, Semi-finals, 26 September 2002
Malmö FF – Djurgårdens IF, Round 4, 26 June 2003
Record European defeat: Real Madrid 8–0 Malmö FF, UEFA Champions League Group stage, 8 December 2015
Record home defeat: Malmö FF 0–6 IFK Göteborg, Allsvenskan, 14 May 2001
Record away defeat: Kalmar FF 9–0 Malmö FF, Division 2, 19 August 1928

Streaks
 Longest unbeaten run (League): 49 matches, 6 May 1949 to 1 June 1951
 Longest winning streak (League): 23 matches, 15 May 1949 to 7 May 1950
 Longest losing streak (League): 5 matches
1 November 1931 to 1 May 1932
12 August 1953 to 13 September 1953
14 May 1961 to 11 June 1961
25 August 1966 to 22 September 1966
 Longest drawing streak (League): 4 matches
5 May 1966 to 26 May 1966
6 September 1978 to 20 September 1978
3 June 1984 to 26 June 1984
31 March 2008 to 13 April 2008
 Longest streak without a win (League): 11 matches, 4 June 1939 to 29 October 1939
 Longest scoring run (League): 27 matches, 6 May 1949 to 22 October 1950
 Longest non-scoring run (League): 4 matches
30 August 1953 to 20 September 1953
13 June 1979 to 25 June 1979
 Longest streak without conceding a goal (League): 7 matches, 23 April 1978 to 12 July 1978

Wins/draws/losses in a season
 Most wins in a league season: 21 in 30 matches, Allsvenskan, 2010 and 2016
 Most draws in a league season: 12 in 26 matches, Allsvenskan, 1995
 Most defeats in a league season: 15 in 26 matches, Allsvenskan, 1999
 Fewest wins in a league season: 1 in 10 matches, Svenska Serien, 1922–23
 Fewest draws in a league season: 1 in 10 matches, Division 2, 1920–21
 Fewest defeats in a league season: 0
In 18 matches, Division 2, 1934–35
In 22 matches, Allsvenskan, 1949–50

Goals
 Most League goals scored in a season: 82 in 22 matches, Allsvenskan, 1949–50
 Fewest League goals scored in a season: 6 in 10 matches, Svenska Serien, 1922–23
 Most League goals conceded in a season: 68 in 22 matches, Allsvenskan, 1931–32
 Fewest League goals conceded in a season: 2 in 18 matches, Division 2, 1930–31

Points
 Most points in a season:
Two points for a win: 43 in 26 matches, Allsvenskan, 1974
Three points for a win: 67 in 30 matches, Allsvenskan, 2010
 Fewest points in a season:
Two points for a win: 4 in 10 matches, Svenska Serien, 1922–23
Three points for a win: 25 in 26 matches, Allsvenskan, 1999

Attendances
 Highest attendance at Malmö Stadion: 29,328, Malmö FF 1–2 Helsingborgs IF, Allsvenskan, 24 September 1967.
 Highest attendance at Stadion: 24,148, Malmö FF 2–0 Mjällby AIF, Allsvenskan, 7 November 2010.
 Highest attendance at Malmö IP: 22,436, Malmö FF 0–3 Helsingborgs IF, Allsvenskan, 1 June 1956.
 Highest attendance average at Malmö Stadion: 20,061, 2004 season.
 Highest attendance average at Stadion: 17,841, 2016 season.
 Highest attendance average at Malmö IP: 17,290, 1949–50 season.

Allsvenskan records held by the club
As of the end of the 2016 season.

Competitive record
Statistics correct as of the end of the 2016 season

Key
 S = Seasons
 Pld = Played
 W = Games won
 D = Games drawn
 L = Games lost
 GF = Goals for
 GA = Goals against
 GD = Goal difference

Domestic record

The following is a list of the all-time statistics from Malmö FF's games in domestic football, as well as the overall total. The statistics does not include the post league competitions held in the 1980s and 1990s, Allsvenskan play-offs and Mästerskapsserien.

European record

The following is a list of the all-time statistics from Malmö FF's games in the four UEFA tournaments it has participated in, as well as the overall total. The statistics include qualification matches.

Footnotes

References

 General
  (Swedish)
  (Swedish)
 Specific

Records
Malmo FF